Desmond Collymore (born 28 June 1956) is a Saint Lucian cricketer. He played in 29 first-class and 12 List A matches for the Windward Islands from 1977 to 1990.

See also
 List of Windward Islands first-class cricketers

References

External links
 

1956 births
Living people
Saint Lucian cricketers
Windward Islands cricketers